Juan Amorós (10 June 1936 – 16 November 2016) was a Spanish cinematographer. His career spanned five decades and in 1990 he was nominated for a Goya Award for Best Cinematography for Esquilache. In 1992 he won the Cinema Writers Circle Award for Best Cinematography for Las cartas de Alou. He died in Madrid on 16 November 2016, at the age of 80.

Filmography
Libertarias
Reinas
Celos
El Amante Bilingüe
El Crimen del Capitán Sánchez
Fanny Pelopaja
 Lulú de noche (1986)
The Trap
Esquilache

References

External links

1936 births
2016 deaths
People from Barcelona
Spanish cinematographers